Roger Federer's 2011 tennis season brought no Major victories but was not entirely unsuccessful. This year, when he turned thirty, marked a decline in his standing in the sport. It was the first year since 2002 that he did not win a Grand Slam title, and, with the ascendance of Novak Djokovic to World No. 1, his ranking dropped from 2 to 3 behind Rafael Nadal. However, this season had some high points. In the French Open semifinals, Federer defeated Djokovic and ended his 43-match win streak. Also, he ended the year well by winning three straight titles, including a title at the Paris Masters,  and successfully defended his title at the year-end ATP Championships.

Year summary

Australian Open and early hard court season
Federer began the year ranked as the world no. 2 according to the Association of Tennis Professionals rankings. Federer once again started his year with an exhibition tournament in Abu Dhabi. He beat Robin Söderling in his opening match, before losing to Rafael Nadal in his second match. Federer then got his competitive season underway in Doha. In the first two rounds, Federer beat two qualifiers. The first match was memorable, as Federer pulled off another "tweener", a shot between the legs. Federer defeated Viktor Troicki in the quarterfinals and Jo-Wilfried Tsonga in the semifinals, both in straight sets. Federer then went on to beat Nikolay Davydenko in straight sets for his third title in Doha and the 67th of his career.

At the Australian Open, Federer beat Lukáš Lacko in the first round. In the next round, he faced Gilles Simon. Federer won the first two sets easily, but Simon fought back to win the next two sets, before Federer came back to win the last set, tying up the match. Against Xavier Malisse in the third round, Federer set another record, as he defeated the Belgian in straight sets, surpassing Stefan Edberg's record for the number of matches won at the Australian Open in the open era, winning his 57th Australian Open match. In the fourth round, Federer beat Tommy Robredo and equalled Jimmy Connors' record of 27 consecutive Grand Slam quarterfinals. He defeated Stanislas Wawrinka in the quarterfinal, and in a repeat of the 2008 Australian Open semifinals, Djokovic once again defeated Federer in a tight and exciting match. His loss at the 2011 Australian Open marked the first time that he did not hold a Grand Slam title since his first Grand Slam title at the 2003 Wimbledon Championships.
 
Next, he participated in the Dubai Tennis Championships, a tournament from which he had been absent for two years. In the first round, he beat Somdev Devvarman, and beat Marcel Granollers in the second round, also in straight sets. In the quarterfinals, he beat Sergiy Stakhovsky, and in the semifinals, he beat Richard Gasquet, successfully reaching his second final of the season without dropping a set. He was then beaten by Novak Djokovic in straight sets.

Federer's next tournament was the Indian Wells Masters in California. He received a bye in the first round and defeated Igor Andreev in the second round. In the third round, he beat Juan Ignacio Chela. In the fourth round, he faced American wildcard Ryan Harrison and won yet again in straight sets. In the quarterfinals, he won over his compatriot and occasional doubles partner Wawrinka. In the semifinals, he once again faced Djokovic, but succumbed to him, losing the match in three sets and losing his no. 2 ranking. Federer also entered the men's doubles draw at Indian Wells, partnering with Wawrinka. In the first round, they defeated second seeds Daniel Nestor and Max Mirnyi in straight sets. In the second round, they faced the French duo of Julien Benneteau and Richard Gasquet and defeated them in a tiebreak. They then defeated Mark Knowles and Michal Mertiňák in the quarterfinals, and defeated defending champions Rafael Nadal and Marc López in the semifinals. In the final, they lost to Alexandr Dolgopolov and Xavier Malisse in three tight sets.

Federer next participated in the Sony Ericsson Open in Miami. He received a bye in the first round and defeated Radek Štěpánek in the second in straight sets. In the third round, he faced Juan Mónaco and won in two tight sets. In the fourth round, Federer beat Olivier Rochus in straight sets. He advanced to the semifinals when Gilles Simon retired at three games down. He went on to face Nadal, but lost in straight sets.

Clay court season and French Open

Federer's first tournament in the 2011 clay-court season was the Monte-Carlo Rolex Masters. After a bye in the first round, he defeated German Philipp Kohlschreiber. He then faced Marin Čilić, whom he defeated. He was then defeated in the quarterfinals by Austrian Jürgen Melzer.

After receiving a bye in the first round at the Madrid Masters, he faced Feliciano López in the second round, narrowly winning in three tight sets. He then beat Xavier Malisse and Robin Söderling without dropping a set, before losing to eventual runner-up Rafael Nadal.

Federer next played in the Rome Masters. He was seeded third behind Nadal and Djokovic and faced Jo-Wilfried Tsonga in the second round, defeating him in straight sets. He next faced Richard Gasquet, but fell to the Frenchman, after losing a deciding third-set tiebreak.

Federer next played in the French Open at Roland Garros, where he opened against Feliciano López in the first round and won in straight sets. He followed up this win with another win in straight sets over wildcard Maxime Teixeira. He then went on to face the 29th seed Janko Tipsarević and dispatched him easily. He then faced compatriot and 14th seed Stanislas Wawrinka and defeated him in straight sets, to stay as one of the few players left in the tournament without a dropped set. He next faced ninth seed and home favorite Gaël Monfils, whom he defeated in straight sets with a tie-break in the third set. Federer faced Djokovic in the semifinals, where he ended Djokovic's perfect 2011 undefeated record in four sets. Federer faced Nadal in the final for a fourth time, but lost to him in four sets.

Grass court season and Wimbledon
Federer was scheduled to play in the 2011 Gerry Weber Open in Germany, but withdrew, citing a need to rest ahead of Wimbledon. Federer entered Wimbledon as the third seed, his lowest since the 2002 championships. He defeated Mikhail Kukushkin in the first round in straight sets, after Kukushkin brought him to a first-set tiebreak. He then defeated Adrian Mannarino and David Nalbandian in the second and third rounds, respectively, in straight sets. He then faced Mikhail Youzhny. After losing the first-set tiebreak on an unforced error, he recovered in the next three sets to take the match. Federer entered his 29th straight Grand Slam quarterfinal match with a positive record against his opponent, Jo-Wilfried Tsonga. He started strong in the first set, locking up the set in less than half an hour, but Tsonga responded, as the two went to a tiebreak in the second, which Federer won. Tsonga then began to work his way around Federer and broke him down, taking the next three sets by breaking Federer and holding serve. Despite a statistically stunning game (64 winners to just 11 unforced errors), Federer simply could not respond and lost a close match in five sets, making this the first time in the season that Federer did not make a Grand Slam semifinal. It was also the first time in 179 matches (and only the third time overall) that Federer lost a match after winning the first two sets.

US Open Series and US Open
To open the US Open Series, Federer participated in the Rogers Cup in Montreal, where he had finished as runner-up the previous year to Andy Murray. He moved through to the third round after defeating wildcard Vasek Pospisil in straight sets. In the third round, he lost his second consecutive match to Tsonga (the first being in the quarterfinals of Wimbledon). Federer battled with Tsonga in the first set to a tiebreak, which Tsonga won. He then recovered by winning the second set and leveling the match at one set all, but Tsonga broke him down quickly in the third set to clinch a spot in the quarterfinals. He consequently held a slim 4–3 head-to-head count against Tsonga, after losing their last two meetings. His early exit from the tournament left Novak Djokovic, the eventual champion, as the sole Big Four player left in the main draw, as Murray and Nadal were both upset in the second round by unseeded players.

Federer entered the Cincinnati Masters as the defending champion, winning the title last year over Mardy Fish. In the second round, he faced Juan Martín del Potro, a player who won his last two meetings against Federer at the 2009 US Open final and the 2009 ATP World Tour Finals. Federer defeated del Potro in a highly anticipated match. He then defeated James Blake, who had defeated him in the quarterfinals of the 2008 Summer Olympics, in the next round. He faced Tomáš Berdych, who had defeated him in the quarterfinals of the 2010 Wimbledon Championships and had won two out of their last three meetings, in the quarterfinals. After a shaky start and a plethora of unforced errors, Federer lost the match, hence failing to defend his title.

Federer next participated in the 2011 US Open, where he finished last year as a semifinalist after a momentous loss to Djokovic. He started off in the first round with a win against Santiago Giraldo, then breezed past Dudi Sela in straight sets. He next faced 27th-seeded Marin Čilić. After winning the first set and dropping the second after Čilić took a break in the otherwise tight set, Federer cruised through the remainder of the match and defeated Čilić. He cruised past Argentine Juan Mónaco in a late-night match in straight sets, dropping only three games during his victory. He was set up to meet Jo-Wilfried Tsonga, against whom he had lost their previous two encounters. Federer went through the first two sets rather smoothly and held a resurgent Tsonga at bay in the third, defeating him in straight sets. He played Novak Djokovic in the semifinals in a rematch of their Roland Garros semifinal match, where Federer had snapped Djokovic's 43-match winning streak and perfect season start. Federer started strong, winning the first two very close sets in dramatic fashion, but began to show small cracks in his game and lost the next two sets. Both players traded excellent points and service games in those sets. In the deciding set, both Federer and Djokovic held serve until Federer managed to break Djokovic and serve for the match. Despite holding two match points, Federer, in a repeat of last year's US Open match, failed to convert on those match points and Djokovic broke back. As a result, Djokovic gained momentum and won four games in a row to defeat Federer in a very close match. Federer recorded his fourth season loss to Djokovic, losing yet another opportunity to win his first major since the 2010 Australian Open. His loss to Djokovic also marked the second time that season and in his career that he lost a match after winning the first two sets.

European Indoor Season
Federer pulled out of the 2011 Shanghai Masters, citing nagging injuries. As a result, he lost 600 ranking points, which contributed to his drop from world no. 3 to no. 4. This marked the first time that he was outside of the top 3 since the 2003 Wimbledon Championships.

Federer's next tournament was the Swiss Indoors Basel, which opened nearly one and a half months after his last major tournament at the Davis Cup and two months after his last ATP tournament, the US Open. As the defending champion and the world no. 4, Federer was seeded third behind Djokovic and Murray, and faced Italian Potito Starace. After a shaky start, he defeated Starace in straight sets. He then faced Jarkko Nieminen, who was fresh off a victory over Thomaz Bellucci. Federer blew through the first set, but a few mistakes in the second allowed Nieminen to take the set, bringing it to a tiebreak set. Federer eventually closed the match out with a tally. He then played against Andy Roddick, against whom he has a prolific rivalry, and routed him quickly in a win. In the semifinals, he met Wawrinka for the fourth time in the season. Wawrinka brought Federer to a first-set tiebreak, but Federer won the tiebreak and then took the second set to win the match. Federer played Kei Nishikori in his eighth Basel final, after Nishikori upset the no. 1 seed Djokovic in the semifinals. Federer pulled a quick victory over Nishikori to claim his second consecutive title, his fifth title at Basel, and his second title of the year.

After Basel, Federer won the BNP Paribas Masters in Paris for the first time in his career. He opened up against Frenchman Adrian Mannarino and finished the match in under an hour, winning in straight sets. He next played against Frenchman Richard Gasquet, whom he played last in the Rome Masters, and made short work of him as well. Federer then faced Juan Mónaco, whom he had met at the US Open, in the quarterfinals. After a tight second set, he sealed the match, marking his 800th career match. He next faced Tomáš Berdych in the semifinals, and avenged his loss in Cincinnati with a win in 80 minutes. His win over Berdych made him the first man in the Open Era to reach the final of each of the nine Masters 1000 tournaments. He recorded a straight sets win in 86 minutes over hometown favourite Tsonga in the final to claim his first Paris Masters 1000 trophy.
It was his fourth season win over Tsonga, his third title of the year and his second title in two weeks. With his straight sets win, he became the fourth person in history to finish the Paris Masters without dropping a set.

Federer finished the ATP season by participating in the 2011 ATP World Tour Finals. He was the fourth player to qualify to the Finals this year, and has qualified for the tenth time. He was drawn into Group B, which included Tsonga, debutant Mardy Fish, and arch-rival Rafael Nadal. In his opening round robin match against Tsonga, Federer opened the match with a quick first set. Tsonga came back to life in the second set and evened things out by winning the second set, forcing a deciding set. Federer, who had never won a deciding third set against Tsonga, found a break opportunity late in the set and converted it to win his seventh season match against Tsonga with a score.
In his next match against Nadal, Federer won 10 of the last 11 games in the match to rout him in exactly one hour, securing his spot in the semifinals in his 26th meeting with Nadal. Federer therefore brought his win–loss record against Nadal to 9–17 and his indoor record against Nadal to 4–0. In his final round robin match, Federer played Fish for the first time in the season. He defeated Fish after dropping the second set.
Federer faced the runner-up from Group B, David Ferrer, and defeated him soundly in a straight sets win. Federer advanced to his 100th career final with his win over Ferrer. In the final, he played Tsonga for the eighth time this season in their second consecutive final. After skating past Tsonga with a break in the first set, he was unable to serve out the match in the second, giving up a break to Tsonga. He then held match point at, but Tsonga saved it with a forehand winner and brought the match to a tiebreak. Federer held a slight lead late in the tiebreak, but ended up dropping the set due to backhand errors. Federer then rebounded by picked up a break in the deciding set and wrapped up the match with a tally, claiming his 70th career title and a record 6th ATP World Tour Finals title. He finished the season with a 17-match win streak, which includes three titles won in a matter of four weeks.

Davis Cup
Federer participated in the Davis Cup Europe/Africa Zone Group I Portugal vs. Switzerland match-up in Bern, where he and Wawrinka teamed up to qualify Switzerland for the World Group Playoffs by sweeping Portugal, 5–0. Federer first played Rui Machado in a singles draw. After dropping the first set, he won the next three to bring Switzerland's score to 2–0. He then teamed up with Wawrinka, also his gold-medal winning doubles partner at the 2008 Summer Olympics, to defeat Frederico Gil and Leonardo Tavares in straight sets, sealing a victory for Switzerland. His final match was scheduled to be a dead rubber against Frederico Gil, but the schedule was changed so that he would not have to play.

Federer led the Swiss team to the World Group Play-offs Australia vs. Switzerland match-up in Sydney. Switzerland entered the match-up with an 0–4 win–loss record versus the Australians. Federer played Lleyton Hewitt in the second rubber, following Wawrinka's surprising loss to Bernard Tomic. Federer dropped the first set, after Hewitt capitalized on the only break of serve in the set, but Federer regained momentum after winning a second-set tiebreak and finished the match strong, levelling the match-up score at 1–1. In the doubles rubber, Federer and Wawrinka faced off against Hewitt and Chris Guccione and started off strong with a first-set win. However, in a surprise upset, Hewitt and Guccione ran away with the match, gaining momentum after winning the second set on a contested break point that was won by the Australians earlier in the set. Federer dropped to 11–6 in Davis Cup doubles with the loss to Hewitt and Guccione. Federer played Bernard Tomic in the fourth rubber, which might have decided the match-up in favor of the Australians. Federer jumped out to a two-set lead after a closely fought second set, but Tomic took the third set to extend the match to four sets. Federer eventually prevailed, levelling the match-up at 2–2. The deciding rubber between Wawrinka and Hewitt, played to five sets and over four hours, decided the matchup in favor of the Swiss, and Switzerland advanced to the 2012 Davis Cup World Group.

All matches

Singles matches

Doubles matches

2011 Tournament Schedule

Singles schedule

Doubles schedule

Yearly Records

Head-to-Head matchups
Ordered by number of wins

 Jo-Wilfried Tsonga 6–2
 Stanislas Wawrinka 4–0
 Juan Mónaco 3–0
 Marin Čilić 2–0
 Feliciano López 2–0
 Xavier Malisse 2–0
 Adrian Mannarino 2–0
 Gilles Simon 2–0
 Richard Gasquet 2–1
 Igor Andreev 1–0
 James Blake 1–0
 Juan Ignacio Chela 1–0
 Marco Chiudinelli 1–0
 Nikolay Davydenko 1–0
 Juan Martín del Potro 1–0
 Somdev Devvarman 1–0
 David Ferrer 1–0
 Mardy Fish 1–0
 Santiago Giraldo 1–0
 Marcel Granollers 1–0
 Ryan Harrison 1–0
 Lleyton Hewitt 1–0
 Philipp Kohlschreiber 1–0
 Mikhail Kukushkin 1–0
 Lukáš Lacko 1–0
 Rui Machado 1–0
 Gaël Monfils 1–0
 David Nalbandian 1–0
 Jarkko Nieminen 1–0
 Kei Nishikori 1–0
 Vasek Pospisil 1–0
 Tommy Robredo 1–0
 Olivier Rochus 1–0
 Thomas Schoorel 1–0
 Dudi Sela 1–0
 Robin Söderling 1–0
 Sergiy Stakhovsky 1–0
 Potito Starace 1–0
 Radek Štěpánek 1–0
 Andy Roddick 1–0
 Maxime Teixeira 1–0
 Janko Tipsarević 1–0
 Bernard Tomic 1–0
 Viktor Troicki 1–0
 Mikhail Youzhny 1–0
 Tomáš Berdych 1–1
 Rafael Nadal 1–3
 Novak Djokovic 1–4
 Jürgen Melzer 0–1

Finals

Singles: 6 (4–2)

Doubles: 1 (0–1)

Exhibitions: 1 (0–1)

Earnings

Awards
Stefan Edberg Sportsmanship Award
Record seventh award in career
ATPWorldTour.com Fans' Favourite
Record ninth consecutive award in career

See also
2011 Rafael Nadal tennis season
2011 Novak Djokovic tennis season

References

External links
  
 ATP tour profile

2011
Federer season
2011 in Swiss tennis
2011 in Swiss sport